Ben Colter Polygonal Barn, also known as the Reinhart Barn, is a historic hexagonal barn located at St. Marys Township, Adams County, Indiana.  It was built about 1907, and is a six-sided, two-story, frame barn with a cone roof and cupola.  Attached to the barn is a drive-through shed.

It was listed on the National Register of Historic Places in 1993.

References

Round barns in Indiana
Barns on the National Register of Historic Places in Indiana
Buildings and structures completed in 1907
Buildings and structures in Adams County, Indiana
National Register of Historic Places in Adams County, Indiana
1907 establishments in Indiana